Ab Barik (also Romanized as Āb Bārīk and Āb-e Bārīk) is a village in Qarah Kahriz Rural District, Qarah Kahriz District, Shazand County, Markazi Province, Iran. At the 2006 census, its population was 291, in 91 families.

References 

Populated places in Shazand County